Takasaka Dam is a gravity dam located in Yamagata Prefecture in Japan. The dam is used for flood control and power production. The catchment area of the dam is 68.2 km2. The dam impounds about 110  ha of land when full and can store 19050 thousand cubic meters of water. The construction of the dam was started on 1962 and completed in 1967.

References

Dams in Yamagata Prefecture
1967 establishments in Japan